The Morning Post was a conservative daily newspaper published in London from 1772 to 1937.

Morning Post may also refer to:

 African Morning Post, a daily newspaper in Accra, Gold Coast
 Shanghai Morning Post, a Chinese-language tabloid newspaper
 Morning Post (Cairns), former name of The Cairns Post, a newspaper in Queensland, Australia
 Sunday Morning Post, the Sunday version of South China Morning Post, an English-language newspaper of Hong Kong
 Independence Morning Post, a Chinese-language newspaper published in Taiwan alongside the Independence Evening Post from 1988 to 1999